Frederick George Barry (January 12, 1845 – May 7, 1909) was an American Civil War veteran, lawyer, and politician who served two terms as a U.S. Representative from Mississippi from 1885 to 1889.

Biography 
Born in Woodbury, Tennessee, Barry received a limited education. He served as a private in Company E, Eighth Confederate Cavalry, Col. William B. Wade's regiment, during the Civil War.

Returning to private life, he studied law and was admitted to the bar, commencing practice in Aberdeen, Mississippi. He moved to West Point, Mississippi, in 1873 and continued the practice of law, also serving as member of the Mississippi State Senate from 1875 to 1879.

Congress 
Barry was elected as a Democrat to the Forty-ninth and Fiftieth Congresses (March 4, 1885 – March 3, 1889). He was not a candidate for renomination in 1888.

Later career and death 
He then resumed the practice of law in West Point, where he died at the age of 64. He was interred in Odd Fellows Rest Cemetery, Aberdeen, Mississippi.

References

External links

1845 births
1909 deaths
People from Woodbury, Tennessee
Democratic Party members of the United States House of Representatives from Mississippi
Democratic Party Mississippi state senators
19th-century American politicians
People from West Point, Mississippi
Confederate States Army soldiers